Erymnae or Erymnai (ancient Greek: Ὲρυμναί) may refer to:
 Erymna, a town of ancient Pamphylia
 Eurymenae, a town of ancient Thessaly